Núria Calduch i Benages (born 26 March 1957) is a Spanish biblical scholar and Roman Curia official.

She graduated in Philosophy and Literature from the Autonomous University of Barcelona in 1979 and a doctorate in Sacred Scripture from the Pontifical Biblical Institute in Rome. She is also professor at the Pontifical Gregorian University since 2010 and guest professor at the Pontifical Biblical Institute and is considered an authority in the study of the wisdom books of the Old Testament.

Benedict XVI appointed her as an expert of the Synod of Bishops on the Word of God celebrated in 2008, and Pope Francis appointed her as a member of the Study Commission on the Women's Diaconate in 2016..

On 9 March 2021, Pope Francis chose her to be the Secretary of the Pontifical Biblical Commission becoming the first woman to reach this office.

References 

1957 births
Living people
People from Barcelona
20th-century Spanish nuns
Women officials of the Roman Curia
Autonomous University of Barcelona alumni
Pontifical Biblical Institute alumni
Old Testament scholars
Academics from Catalonia
Academic staff of the Pontifical Gregorian University
21st-century Spanish nuns